The Tifton Gazette is a daily newspaper published in Tifton, Georgia. It is operated by South Georgia Media Group, a division of Community Newspaper Holdings Inc. CNHI acquired the paper in 2000 from Thomson.

References

External links 
 "The Tifton Gazette Article April 12th, 2014"
 The Tifton Gazette Website
 CNHI Website

Newspapers published in Georgia (U.S. state)
Tift County, Georgia
Publications established in 1888